Rui Campos do Nascimento known as Rui (born September 23, 1960) is a Brazilian former volleyball player who competed in the 1984 Summer Olympics.

In 1984 he was part of the Brazilian team which won the silver medal in the Olympic tournament. He played two matches.

External links
 profile

1960 births
Living people
Brazilian men's volleyball players
Olympic volleyball players of Brazil
Volleyball players at the 1984 Summer Olympics
Olympic silver medalists for Brazil
Olympic medalists in volleyball
Medalists at the 1984 Summer Olympics
20th-century Brazilian people